Mohamed Elelfat (born 25 June 1979) is an Egyptian Paralympic powerlifter competing in the -72 kg class. Elelfat has participated in four Summer Paralympic Games winning silver in the -75 kg category in the 2012 Games in London. He also won the bronze medal in the men's 80 kg event at the 2020 Summer Paralympics held in Tokyo, Japan. A few months later, he won the bronze medal in his event at the 2021 World Para Powerlifting Championships held in Tbilisi, Georgia.

Personal history
Elelfat was born in Egypt in 1979. He was educated at Menoufia University in Al Minufya. He is married and has one child.

References

External links
 

Egyptian powerlifters
Paralympic powerlifters of Egypt
1979 births
Living people
Powerlifters at the 2008 Summer Paralympics
Powerlifters at the 2012 Summer Paralympics
Powerlifters at the 2016 Summer Paralympics
Powerlifters at the 2020 Summer Paralympics
Medalists at the 2008 Summer Paralympics
Medalists at the 2012 Summer Paralympics
Medalists at the 2016 Summer Paralympics
Medalists at the 2020 Summer Paralympics
Paralympic silver medalists for Egypt
Paralympic bronze medalists for Egypt
Paralympic medalists in powerlifting
20th-century Egyptian people
21st-century Egyptian people